Sambú District is a district (distrito) of Comarca Emberá-Wounaan in Panama. The capital is Puerto Indio.  The area of this district is 1296.4 sq. kilometers. It is on the western part of Comarca Emberá-Wounaan. The other side of the Comarca is Cémaco District.

Administrative divisions
Sambú District is divided administratively into the following corregimientos: 

 Río Sábalo
 Jingurudo

See also
 Panama
 Districts of Panama
 Embera-Wounaan, indigenous peoples of Colombia and Panama
 Emberá languages, indigenous language family in Colombia and Panama

Notes

References

Districts of Panama
Comarca Emberá-Wounaan